The 37th International 500-Mile Sweepstakes was held at the Indianapolis Motor Speedway on Saturday, May 30, 1953. The event was part of the 1953 AAA National Championship Trail, and was race 2 of 9 in the 1953 World Championship of Drivers.

Bill Vukovich, after falling short a year before, earned the first of two consecutive Indy 500 victories. With the temperature in the high 90s (°F), and the track temperature exceeding , this race is often known as the "Hottest 500." Driver Carl Scarborough dropped out the race, and later died at the infield hospital due to heat prostration.

Due to the extreme heat conditions, several drivers in the field required relief drivers, and some relief drivers even required additional relief. Vukovich, however, as well as second-place finisher Art Cross, both ran the full 500 miles solo.

Race details

Practice
Sixteen-year race veteran Chet Miller died in an accident in practice on May 15.

Qualifying
Time trials were scheduled for four days.

Saturday May 16 – Pole Day time trials (rained out)
Sunday May 17 – Second day time trials
Saturday May 23 – Third day time trials 
Sunday May 24 – Fourth day time trials

Race
Polesitter Bill Vukovich dominated the race, leading 195 laps and also recording fastest lap.

 The race is commonly known as the "Hottest 500", with track temperatures exceeding . Recent research, however, has suggested that the 1937 race actually had higher recorded temperatures. Half the drivers in the field used relief help, including:
 Duane Carter (49 laps) took over from Sam Hanks (151)
 Paul Russo (96) took over from Fred Agabashian (104)
 Eddie Johnson (88) took over from Jim Rathmann (112)
 Gene Hartley (37) and Chuck Stevenson (44) took over from Tony Bettenhausen (115)
 Bob Scott (121) took over from Carl Scarborough (69)
 Jim Rathmann (36) took over from Bill Holland (141)
 Duke Dinsmore (10) and Andy Linden (29) took over from Rodger Ward (138)
 Johnny Mantz (42) took over from Walt Faulkner (134)
 Jackie Holmes (9) and Johnny Thomson (45) took over from Spider Webb (112)
 Andy Linden (12) and Chuck Stevenson (13) took over from Jerry Hoyt (82)

Carl Scarborough retired from the race due to heat exhaustion, and died later at the infield hospital.

Box score 

Notes
 – Includes 1 point for fastest lead lap

Alternates
First alternate: Eddie Johnson (#26)

Failed to qualify

Frank Armi  (#79)
Alberto Ascari (#97) – Did not appear
Henry Banks (#10)
Buzz Barton  (#35)
Joe Barzda  (#69)
Bill Boyd  (#86)
Billy Cantrell  (#42)
Neal Carter  (#23)
George Connor (#25)
Ray Crawford  (#49)
Jorge Daponte  (#95)
Billy DeVore (#28)
Duke Dinsmore (#52)
Bill Doster 
Len Duncan  (#31, #81)
Edgar Elder  (#49)
Johnny Fedricks  (#46)
John Fitch  (#49, #74)
George Fonder (#76)
Gene Force (#48)
Potsy Goacher  (#36)
Cliff Griffith (#24)
Red Hamilton  (#91)
Allen Heath  (#65) 
Al Herman  (#93)
Jackie Holmes (#71)
Bill Homeier  (#84, #87)
Johnny Kay  (#67)
Jud Larson  (#96)
Jim Mayes  (#34)
Johnny Mauro (#47) – Did not appear
Chet Miller (#15) – Fatal accident
Roy Newman  (#43)
Danny Oakes  (#63)
Pat O'Connor  (#28, #64, #74)
Jimmy Reece (#16)
Johnny Roberts  (#82)
Hal Robson (#57)
Troy Ruttman (#2)
Eddie Sachs  (#34)
Wayne Selser  (#75)
Joe Sostilio  (#17)
Harry Stockman  (#84)
Bill Taylor  (#39)
George Tichenor  (#65)
Johnnie Tolan  (#66, #85)
Leroy Warriner  (#44)
Ebe Yoder

Race notes
 Pole position: Bill Vukovich – 4:20.13 (4 laps)
 Fastest lead lap: Bill Vukovich – 1:06.240
 The purse for first place was $89,496 (US$ in  dollars).
One of the prizes awarded to the winner was a pet dog and a year's supply of dog food.

Broadcasting

Radio
The race was carried live flag-to-flag on the Indianapolis Motor Speedway Radio Network. Instead of being produced by 1070 WIBC-AM, the network pooled together talent and technical staff from all five of the major radio stations in Indianapolis. The broadcast was anchored by Sid Collins, and featured on-air talent from WIBC, WFBM, WISH, WIRE, and WXLW.

The broadcast signed on at 10:45 a.m. local time, and carried live through the conclusion, until 3:45 p.m. local time. The broadcast was carried on 135 stations in at least 35 states across the country, and on Armed Forced Network to Europe and Asia.

Championship standings after the race
World Drivers' Championship standings

Note: Only the top five positions are included. Only the best 4 results counted towards the Championship.

Gallery

References

External links
Indianapolis 500 History: Race & All-Time Stats – Official Site
Van Camp's Pork & Beans Presents: Great Moments From the Indy 500 – Fleetwood Sounds, 1975
1953 Indianapolis 500 Radio Broadcast, Indianapolis Motor Speedway Radio Network: Re-broadcast on "The History of the 500" – WFNI (May 12, 2013)

Indianapolis 500 races
Indianapolis 500
Indianapolis 500
Indianapolis
1953 in American motorsport
Indy